Tyler v. Hennepin County (Docket 22-166) is a pending United States Supreme Court case about government seizure of property for unpaid taxes, when the value of the property seized is greater than the tax debt. The court will decide whether such a forfeiture violates the Fifth Amendment's protection against taking property without just compensation. The court will also decide whether it is an unconstitutional fine under the Eighth Amendment.

Geraldine Tyler owed $15,000 in property taxes and other associated costs. Hennepin County, Minnesota foreclosed on her condominium, sold it for $40,000, and kept all of the money.

Tyler sued the county, arguing that the $25,000 surplus home equity value was property that the county took away from her in violation of the Fifth Amendment and Eighth Amendment. The district court dismissed the case, ruling in favor of the county on all of Tyler's claims, and the United States Court of Appeals for the Eighth Circuit affirmed. Tyler petitioned to the Supreme Court, which agreed to review the case.

See also 
 Austin v. United States (1993), a case about the Eighth Amendment and forfeiture
 United States v. Bajakajian (1998), another Eighth Amendment forfeiture case

References 

United States Supreme Court cases
2023 in United States case law
United States Supreme Court cases of the Roberts Court
Takings Clause case law
Excessive Fines Clause case law